The Carmelite Sisters of the Most Sacred Heart of Los Angeles  is a Catholic religious institute of the Carmelite Order founded by Mother Maria Luisa Josefa of the Most Blessed Sacrament. It is based in Alhambra, California, a suburb of Los Angeles.

About the Carmelite Sisters
The way of life of the Carmelite Sisters of the Most Sacred Heart of Los Angeles is rooted in the Gospel, the Church, and the spirituality of Carmel as lived out through the charism of their foundress, Venerable Mother Maria Luisa Josefa of the Most Blessed Sacrament. Their mission statement is three-fold: "Educating for Life with the Mind and Heart of Christ” in schools; being “At the Service of the Family for Life” through eldercare; and “Fostering a Deeper Spiritual Life” through individual and group retreats.

History
In the 1920s during the revolution and religious persecution in Mexico, Mother Luisita established schools, hospitals, and orphanages despite being scrutinized by the government. "As the fictional women in The Handmaid’s Tale are forced to wear their garb, the real religious women of Mexico were threatened with death for wearing theirs." The very persecution which sought to destroy her work only spread it to another land when Mother Luisita and two companions entered the United States (incognito) as religious refugees on June 24, 1927, the feast of the Sacred Heart of Jesus. They established roots in the Archdiocese of Los Angeles.

The community has grown since its humble beginnings with 3 sisters in 1927.  Today, the Carmelite Sisters of the Most Sacred Heart of Los Angeles has grown to 143 professed sisters.

Apostolic Work
Although most Carmelites are cloistered nuns, the Carmelite Sisters of the Most Sacred Heart of Los Angeles are an active community combining the contemplative charism of Carmel and bringing this spirit out to the world through services in elder care, education and retreat work.  They carry out this work at 13 sites located in the states of California, Arizona, Colorado and Florida, serving tens of thousands of people yearly.

Elder Care
Santa Teresita - established 1930 (Skilled Nursing & Assisted Living)
Marycrest Manor - established 1956 (Skilled Nursing)
Avila Gardens - established 2000 (Independent Living)

Retreat Work
Sacred Heart Retreat House - established 1941 
St. Joseph's Conference and Evangelization Center

Education

Child Care Centers
 Little Flower Educational Child Care Center - established 1929
Hayden Child Care Center - established 1958

Elementary schools
(formerly) Saint Joseph (La Puente, CA)
Saint Philomena (Carson, CA)
Holy Innocents (Long Beach, CA)
Loretto School (Douglas, AZ)
St. Theresa (Coral Gables, FL)
Saints Peter and Paul (Wheat Ridge, CO)

High schools
 Coleman F. Carroll High School (Coral Gables, FL)
JSerra High School (San Juan Capistrano, CA)

Carmelite Saints
 Our Lady of Mount Carmel
 Saint Teresa of Avila 
 Saint John of the Cross
 Saint Therese of the Child Jesus and the Holy Face
 Saint Teresa of Los Andes
 Saint Teresa Benedicta of the Cross (Edith Stein)

Sources

Written by the Sisters 
Moments of Grace: True Stories in the Lives of the Carmelites Sisters of the Most Sacred Heart of Los Angeles. (2015)
Spirit of Carmel published print newsletters (online: 2014-2020)

Written by others 
 Caterine, Darryl V. (2001). Conservative Catholicism and the Carmelites: Identity, Ethnicity, and Tradition in the Modern Church. Indiana University Press.

References

External links
Carmelite Sisters of the Most Sacred Heart of Los Angeles - Official Website

1920s establishments in California
Carmelite Order
Alhambra, California
History of women in California